Kathanayakudu is a 1969 Indian Telugu-language drama film, produced by K. Gopala Krishna under the banner Gopala Krishna Productions and directed by K. Hemambaradhara Rao. It stars N. T. Rama Rao and Jayalalithaa, with music composed by T. V. Raju. The film was remade in Tamil as Nam Naadu (1969), and in Hindi as Apna Desh (1972). The film was recorded as a blockbuster at the box office.The film won two Nandi Awards.

Plot
The film begins in a town where people are exploited by a powerful group of men. The head of these wrongdoers is Dayanandam and his right hand Satyamurthy, a prominent contractor. Another cruel guy who does backbiting and aids these people is Appadu, a ration shop dealer. These people get into every crime to exploit the innocent villagers such as murders, corruption and what not. Saradhi is one confident young man who decides to stop these wrongdoings. He is an idealist and doesn't spare any sort of injustice. He tries to stop every crime committed by this group and Dayanandam tries his best to get Saradhi under their group. They impose pressure on Saradhi's brother Srinivasa Rao, but fail. A rift happens between Saradhi and his brother. When Saradhi is out of the house, he meets a fruit vendor Jaya and a group of hard workers. Meanwhile, municipal elections come up and Saradhi establishes a political party. He wins with a thumping majority and Saradhi becomes the chairperson of the party. But the villains plan to create a rift in Saradhi's party and the rest of the story deals with how Saradhi and Jaya plan to teach a lesson to them.

Cast

Soundtrack

Music composed by T. V. Raju. Music released on Audio Company.

Awards
Nandi Awards - 1969
Best Feature Film - Gold - K. Bala Krishna
Best Story Writer - Mullapudi Venkata Ramana

References

External links
 Katha Nayakudu at IMDb.

1969 films
1960s Telugu-language films
Indian action drama films
Films scored by T. V. Raju
Telugu films remade in other languages
1969 drama films